was a Japanese samurai of the Sengoku period through early Edo period, who served as a retainer of the Sagara clan. His son Sagara Seibei also served sagara clan.

References

Samurai
1521 births
1606 deaths
Sagara clan